The Four Elements of Architecture is a book by the German architect Gottfried Semper. Published in 1851, it is an attempt to explain the origins of architecture through the lens of anthropology. The book divides architecture into four distinct elements: the hearth, the roof, the enclosure and the mound. The origins of each element can be found in the traditional crafts of ancient "barbarians":

 hearth – metallurgy, ceramics
 roof – carpentry
 enclosure – textile, weaving
 mound – earthwork
 
Semper, stating that the hearth was the first element created: 

Enclosures (walls) were said to have their origins in weaving. Just as fences and pens were woven sticks, the most basic form of a spatial divider still seen in use in parts of the world today is the fabric screen. Only when additional functional requirements are placed on the enclosure (such as structural weight-bearing needs) does the materiality of the wall change to something beyond fabric.

The mat and its use in primitive huts interchangeably as floors, walls, and draped over frames was considered by Gottfried Semper to be the origins of architecture.

Semper's Four Elements of Architecture was an attempt at a universal theory of architecture. The Four Elements of Architecture was not the classification of a specific typology but rather was more universal in its attempt to offer a more general theory of architecture. Rather than describing one building typology as being the beginning, he considers what assemblies and systems are universal in all indigenous primitive structures.”

The Four Elements of Architecture as an archaeologically driven theory stressed functionalism as a prerequisite to intentionality.

Sempers primitive hut theory as put forth by the Four Elements of Architecture is considered to be significant in contemporary theory. Semper continues to explore the four elements more closely in subsequent works such as Der Stil.

Notes

References
Semper, Gottfried. The Four Elements of Architecture and Other Writings. Trans. Harry F. Mallgrave and Wolfgang Herrmann (Cambridge, 1989). 
Saint, Andrew. "Semper's Search." Architectural Review 178.1062 (1985): 66.
Hays, K. Architecture Theory. Cambridge, Mass: MIT, 1998.
Whyle, Iain Boyd. "Semper Fidelis." Art History 13.1 (1990): 122.

Further reading 
Semper, Gottfried. Style in the Technical and Tectonic Arts; or, Practical Aesthetics. Trans. Harry F. Mallgrave (Santa Monica, 2004). 
Hvattum, Mari. Gottfried Semper and the Problem of Historicism (Cambridge, 2004). 
Mallgrave, Harry Francis. Gottfried Semper - Architect of the Nineteenth Century (New Haven/London, 1996).

External links
Die vier Elemente der Baukunst. Original text at Internet Archive.

Architecture books
1851 non-fiction books